Donald Anthony Croftcheck (born September 12, 1942) is a former American football offensive lineman in the National Football League (NFL) for the Washington Redskins and the Chicago Bears.  He played college football at Indiana University and was drafted in the eighth round of the 1965 NFL Draft.  Croftcheck was also selected in the seventeenth round of the 1965 AFL Draft by the Kansas City Chiefs.

References

1942 births
Living people
American football offensive linemen
Chicago Bears players
Indiana Hoosiers football players
Washington Redskins players
People from Fayette County, Pennsylvania
Players of American football from Pennsylvania